"Any Day Now" is a popular song written by Burt Bacharach and Bob Hilliard in 1962. It has been recorded by numerous artists over the years, including notable versions by Chuck Jackson in 1962, Alan Price in 1965, Elvis Presley in 1969, Scott Walker in 1973 and Ronnie Milsap in 1982. The lyrics of this song predict the eventual demise of a romantic relationship the lyricist is in with an unnamed person whom the lyricist believes will get away one day and leave the lyricist with feelings of sadness and emptiness for the rest of his/her life.

Chuck Jackson
Jackson, an R&B singer born in South Carolina in 1937, recorded the first version of the song to hit the Billboard Hot 100 chart; it reached number 23 in 1962 with the title "Any Day Now (My Wild Beautiful Bird)" and spent six weeks in the Top 40. Jackson's version appeared on his album, which was also titled Any Day Now. The song was Jackson's highest-charting hit on the US pop chart, and also peaked at number two for three weeks on the Hot Black Sides chart.

Jackson's recording of the song was used over the closing credits of the film Inherent Vice.

Jackson's original backing track was recycled by Scepter for the song "Lover", which was recorded in the early 1960s by Scepter artist Tommy Hunt. The track, which featured an entirely new Hilliard lyric and a partially re-written melody, was not released until 1986.

Charts

Elvis Presley
Presley recorded a cover version of "Any Day Now" on 20 February 1969 at American Sound Studio, Memphis, Tennessee. This version appeared on his acclaimed album of that year, From Elvis in Memphis. Although not released as a single in its own right, the song appeared as the B-side to Presley's No. 3 US pop hit "In the Ghetto", which appeared on the same album. In 2022 it featured in the 'Elvis' movie soundtrack, the song itself and as a remix by PNAU with the name "Don't Fly Away".

Ronnie Milsap

Milsap, a popular country / pop singer, recorded the most widely known version of the song. It was the lead single from his 1982 album Inside, and it peaked at No. 14 on the Billboard Hot 100 chart, spending nine weeks in the Top 40. In addition, this version went to No. 1 on both the Billboard Hot Country Singles chart (for one week) as well as the Hot Adult Contemporary Singles chart (for five weeks). It also went to No. 1 on the Canadian Country and Adult Contemporary Chart for three weeks.

Milsap's producer, Tom Collins, encouraged Milsap to make the song sound different from the original by Chuck Jackson. As a result, Milsap recorded it in a different key and sang it softly.

Charts

Other versions
The song became the theme to the American television drama of the same name that aired on the cable channel Lifetime, starring Annie Potts and Lorraine Toussaint. The verse of the song that appears in this theme was sung by Lori Perry.
Judy Henske included a version on her 1965 album Little Bit Of Sunshine . . . Little Bit Of Rain.
Bill Medley included this song on his 1969 album Soft and Soulful.
Scott Walker released an album named Any Day Now in 1973, which featured the song as its opening track.
Country singer Don Gibson also released a version of "Any Day Now", which reached the Top 40 of the Billboard country music chart in 1979.
Singer Percy Sledge recorded "Any Day Now" in 1969, and this version reached 35 on the Billboard R&B chart and 86 on the Hot 100.
Singer Nick Kamen recorded "Any Day Now" in 1987. The song is featured on his album "Nick Kamen" and is the B-side of his single Win Your Love.
Frankie Valli recorded two versions of "Any Day Now".  Once as part of a medley in 1969 on Half And Half and a full version in 2007 on the album Romancing The 60's .
Luther Vandross recorded "Any Day Now" for his 2001 self-titled album.  The Vandross version was nominated for a 2003 Grammy award in the category of Best Traditional R&B Vocal Performance.
James Brown included a version of "Any Day Now" on his 1969 album It's a Mother.
Carla Thomas included a version of "Any Day Now" on her 1967 album The Queen Alone.
In Italy a cover of the song - with the title "Bambolina" - was released in the 1960s by various groups and singers, among them the beat group I Corvi (1967) and Mal Ryder - a.k.a. Mal dei Primitives (1968).
British pop duo Peter & Gordon included a version of "Any Day Now (My Wild Beautiful Bird)" on their 1965 album True Love Ways.
 Paul Carrack recorded a version for his 2001 album Groovin''' and released it as a single, which did not chart.
 Ian Moss recorded a version for his sixth studio album, Soul on West 53rd (2009).
Long John Baldry recorded a version on his 1980 album, Long John Baldry.
Eddie Kendricks recorded a version for his self-titled 1973 album.
There was also a version by South Shore Commission on Wand Records released in 1975 ... it has a spoken intro and vocalise by female Sheryl Henry ... from their self-titled album

References

Bibliography
Roland, Tom, The Billboard Book of Number One Country Hits Billboard Books, Watson-Guptill Publications, New York, 1991.
Whitburn, Joel (1996). The Billboard Book of Top 40 Hits, 6th Edition (Billboard Publications)
Whitburn, Joel, Top Country Songs: 1944-2005, 2006.
Whitburn, Joel, Top Pop Songs: 1955-2006'', 2007.

External links
 
 

1962 singles
1979 singles
1982 singles
Chuck Jackson songs
James Brown songs
Elvis Presley songs
Percy Sledge songs
Scott Walker (singer) songs
Ronnie Milsap songs
Luther Vandross songs
Frankie Valli songs
Songs with music by Burt Bacharach
Songs with lyrics by Bob Hilliard
Song recordings produced by Tom Collins (record producer)
1962 songs
RCA Records singles
ABC Records singles